The 2021–22 Men's England Hockey League season is the 2021–22 season of England's field hockey league structure and England Hockey Men's Championship Cup. The 2021–22 season returned to normality following two seasons of disruption caused by the COVID-19 pandemic in the United Kingdom. The 2021-22 Premier Division saw the same teams competing from the following season, which had been cancelled. Therefore Surbiton were the defending champions, having won the league during the 2019–20 season.

The season started on 19 September 2021, with the Premier Division using a new system of two phases. The first phase would consist of 10 matches per club and would be completed by the end of 2021, determining the top six clubs (irrespective of home and away advantage) for phase 2. The other divisions would use the traditional format.

Old Georgians secured their first ever Premier division title with two games to spare. The success continued a remarkable rise in English hockey because the team had only been promoted into the league at the start of the 2019-20 season. Six times champions Reading won Division One South and therefore sealed promotion back to the Premier Division following their 2019 relegation (their first in 30 years). University of Nottingham won Division One North to also gain promotion.

Old Georgians went on to secure a league and cup double after winning the 2022 England Hockey Men's Championship Cup.

Final Tables

Premier Division

Division One South

Division One North

England Hockey Men's Championship Cup

Quarter-finals

Semi-finals

Final 
Lee Valley Hockey and Tennis Centre

Old Georgians
George Pinner (gk), Andy Bull, Henry Weir, Nick Page, Kyle Marshall, James Carson, James Tindall, Dan Shingles (capt), Lee Morton, Edward Carson, Ashley Jackson; reps: Tom Carson, Thomas Doran, Elliott Messem, Dan Boden, Ben Jansen; dnp:Chris Proctor, James Cunningham; coach: Mike Hughes; manager:Jonny Stephens.

Oxted
Sam Williams (gk), Owen Williamson (capt), Lewis Fraser, Alex Blumfield, Lucas Ward, Sam Driver, Nick Giles, Chris Webster, Chris Porter, Jamie Batten, Cameron Heald; reps: Edward Carr, Ryan Kavanagh, Adam Miller, Oliver Bennett, Oscar Loft; coach: James Simpson; manager: Peter Crook.

See also
2021–22 Women's England Hockey League season

References

2021-22
England
2021 in English sport
2022 in English sport